Andrés Jiménez Fernández (born 6 June 1962) is a Spanish former professional basketball player. At a height of 2.05 m (6'8 ") tall, he played at the power forward position.

Professional career
Jiménez played with Joventut Badalona and FC Barcelona Bàsquet of the Spanish top-tier level Liga ACB. While playing with FC Barcelona, he won the 1986–87 season's FIBA Korać Cup title. His number 4 jersey was retired by FC Barcelona.

National team career
Jiménez also played for Spain's senior national team at the 1984 Summer Olympics, where they won a silver medal, at the 1988 Summer Olympic Games, and at the 1992 Summer Olympic Games.

He also played with Spain at 4 FIBA World Cups: (1982, 1986, 1990 and 1994). He totaled 33 games played and 345 points (10.5 ppg.) scored during those competitions.

Jiménez also played at 4 EuroBaskets:1983, where he won a silver medal, 1985 and 1987 4th place and 1989 5th.
He totaled 27 games played and 377 points (14.0 ppg.) scored during those competitions.

References

External links
FIBA Profile 1
FIBA Profile 2
FIBA Europe Profile
Spanish League Profile 

1962 births
Living people
Basketball players at the 1984 Summer Olympics
Basketball players at the 1988 Summer Olympics
Basketball players at the 1992 Summer Olympics
FC Barcelona Bàsquet players
Joventut Badalona players
Liga ACB players
Medalists at the 1984 Summer Olympics
Olympic basketball players of Spain
Olympic medalists in basketball
Olympic silver medalists for Spain
People from Campiña de Carmona
Sportspeople from the Province of Seville
Power forwards (basketball)
1986 FIBA World Championship players
1994 FIBA World Championship players
Spanish men's basketball players
1982 FIBA World Championship players
1990 FIBA World Championship players